Galway Suburban Rail is a suburban rail service currently operating on the Dublin–Galway line between Galway, Oranmore and Athenry.

Services
Commuter services in the Athenry–Galway corridor consist of the following:
 Early morning and late evening services between Athlone and Galway serving the County Galway towns of Ballinasloe, Woodlawn and Attymon
 Morning and evening Intercity service originating from Limerick serving the County Galway towns of Gort, Ardrahan and Craughwell
 Evening services which continue to Athlone and Heuston Station, Dublin

Between these routes, there are 14 services in each direction each weekday in this section, with 11 services from Galway and 10 services from Athenry on Sundays.

Future developments
Under the Transport 21 plan, service is planned between Tuam and Galway via the closed line to Claremorris. However, funding for this has not been identified and no Railway Order has yet been sought.

Iarnród Éireann are hoping to increase Galway commuter services with service from Galway to Athenry every 15 minutes (this likely includes services to Dublin and Limerick) and the 2nd platform at Oranmore.

See also
Rail transport in Ireland
Commuter (Iarnród Éireann)

References

External links
Galway Advertiser: Planning Approval granted for Oranmore train station, retrieved 13 March 2011
Galway Public Transport Feasibility Study, retrieved 13 March 2011
Limerick-Galway Rail Timetable 2010, retrieved 13 March 2011
Dublin-Galway Rail Timetable 2010, retrieved 13 March 2011
Oireachtas Written answers Wednesday, 24 March 2010 Department of Transport Light Rail Project, retrieved 13 March 2011
Transport 21 Western Railway Corridor
West On Track
Map of the Western Rail Corridor
Rail Users Ireland Forum

Passenger rail transport in Ireland
Transport in Galway (city)